Bushwhacked is a 1995 American adventure comedy, film starring Daniel Stern, Jon Polito, Anthony Heald and Brad Sullivan. Directed by Greg Beeman, it was his last theatrical film before he moved on to direct television films for Disney Channel beginning in 1997. This also marked Sullivan's last theatrical film appearance before his retirement in 2000 and death in 2008.

Plot
Deliveryman "Mad" Max Grabelski (Daniel Stern) is charged with delivering packages to millionaire Reinhart Bragdon (Anthony Heald) for $50 tips. During a late night delivery, Max accidentally stumbles across a fire in Bragdon's mansion and is cornered by FBI Agent Palmer (Jon Polito), but accidentally picks up Agent Palmer's gun and manages to escape. Max later sees a news report in which Palmer claims that Bragdon was killed in the fire, which was set up by Max to stop him from exposing a money-laundering conspiracy. Now on the run from the law, Max contacts his boss and learns that a final package is to be delivered to Bragdon, but at his mountain cabin in Devil's Peak.

Max heads for Devil's Peak to clear his name, but a store clerk and scoutmaster Jack Erickson (Brad Sullivan) recognize his face and he is forced to threaten both with his gun, gluing Erickson to his car's steering wheel and ordering him to drive off to lure the police away while stealing Erickson's van. He is subsequently mistaken for a scoutmaster scheduled to lead a group of Ranger Scouts (consisting of five boys and one girl) on an expedition. Max goes along with the ruse to keep heading for Devil's Peak. The FBI find and release Erickson, and set up a base of operations at a nearby cabin while Palmer and Erickson pursue Max and the scouts. Though they are nearly captured, Max cuts the bridge between two cliffs, forcing Palmer and Erickson to take the longer route.

Along the way, the scouts become curious of Max's unorthodox capabilities as a scout leader. They build a makeshift radio and learn who Max truly is. They lace his water with sleeping pills and use smoke signs to signal their location to Erickson. Max ends up sedated, but Palmer handcuffs Erickson to a tree and captures Max alone, promising the scouts a rescue helicopter, but the suspicious scouts follow in secret. Max awakens and Palmer leads him to a helicopter, where Max discovers Bragdon is alive; he then reveals that he is a criminal and that Palmer is one of his henchman and their plan was to steal the laundered money from the authorities and Bragdon faking his death after coming under suspicion in order to frame Max. Before they can kill Max, the scouts intervene and knock Palmer out, but Max falls into the river and the scouts follow to rescue him and escape the criminals. They reach safety before going over a waterfall and throw their backpacks in the river to drive Palmer and Bragdon off. Out of supplies, the scouts decide to remain with Max, accepting him as their scout leader and help him reach Devil's Peak. Meanwhile, one of the scouts' mothers, Mrs. Patterson (Ann Dowd) uncovers Max's discarded tissue and realizes that he is leading them to Devil's Peak, and gives chase in her van when Palmer's bumbling assistant, Agent McMurrey (Thomas Mills Wood), refuses to help her. She arrives first, but is captured by Bragdon.

After scaling the treacherous mountainside, Max and the scouts finally arrive as Bragdon receives the final package. Palmer catches up and prepares to kill them, but is subdued by Erickson, who freed himself and followed Max. Max sneaks into the cabin to free Mrs. Patterson. Bragdon appears and forces them to the edge of the cliff at gunpoint. Mrs. Patterson's son, Gordy (Blake Bashoff), charges Bragdon but falls over a cliff and hangs onto a branch for his life. Max knocks Bragdon out and climbs down the cliff and pulls Gordy to safety just before the branch falls away.

With Bragdon and Palmer captured, Max's name is cleared and in response to his efforts, he is awarded a Ranger Scout Leader honor and given charge of an even bigger group of scouts for a more challenging mission, much to his surprise and chagrin.

Cast

Daniel Stern as "Mad" Max Grabelski
Jon Polito as Agent Palmer
Brad Sullivan as Jack Erickson
Ann Dowd as Agatha (Aggie) Patterson
Anthony Heald as Reinhart Bragdon
Tom Wood as Agent McMurrey
Blake Bashoff as Gordy Patterson
Corey Carrier as Ralph
Michael Galeota as Dana Jareki
Michael P. Byrne as Mr. Fishman
Natalie West as Mrs. Fishman
Max Goldblatt as Barnhill
Ari Greenberg as Milton Fishman
Janna Michaels as Kelsey Jordan
Michael O'Neill as Jon Jordan
Jane Morris as Beth Jordan
Paul Ben-Victor as Dana's father
Art Evans as Marty

Critical response
The film received a 10% rating on Rotten Tomatoes based on 20 reviews. It grossed $7.9 million in the United States.

References

External links

1990s adventure comedy films
1995 films
20th Century Fox films
American adventure comedy films
Scouting in popular culture
Films scored by Bill Conti
Films directed by Greg Beeman
Films shot in California
1995 comedy films
Films with screenplays by Tommy Swerdlow
Films about mother–son relationships
1990s English-language films
1990s American films
Films about children